David Bromley may refer to:

 David G. Bromley (born 1941), American professor of sociology
 David Allan Bromley (1926–2005), Canadian–American physicist and academic administrator
 David Bromley (artist) (born 1960), Australian artist